Warnham railway station serves the village of Warnham in West Sussex, England. Warnham is managed by Southern, which also operates all the services.

Services 
All services at Warnham are operated by Southern using Class 377 EMUs.

The typical off-peak service in trains per hour is:
 1 tph to London Victoria via Sutton
 1 tph to 

During the peak hours, the service is increased to 2 tph. There is no service on Saturday evenings (after approximately 18:30) or on Sundays.

Gallery

References

External links 

Horsham District
Railway stations in West Sussex
Former London, Brighton and South Coast Railway stations
Railway stations in Great Britain opened in 1867
Railway stations served by Govia Thameslink Railway